The 1987 European Wrestling Championships were held in the men's Freestyle style in Veliko Tarnovo 1 – 4 May 1987; the Greco-Romane style in Tampere 8 – 11 May 1987.

Medal table

Medal summary

Men's freestyle

Men's Greco-Roman

References

External links
Fila's official championship website

Europe
W
W
European Wrestling Championships
Euro
Euro
Sports competitions in Tampere
1987 in European sport